The Air Historical Branch (AHB) is the historical archive and records service of the Royal Air Force. 

First established in 1919, the AHB was responsible for creating the Official History of British Air Operations in the First World War.

The branch moved from RAF Bentley Priory to RAF Northolt in 2008 after the closure of the former. The Air Historical Branch is tasked with the maintenance and preservation of the history of the RAF.  It is part of the Royal Air Force Centre for Air Power Studies and is headed by Sebastian Cox.

Heads of the Air Historical Branch

References

External links
 Air Historical Branch website

Royal Air Force